Pir Bakhsh is a village and union council, an administrative subdivision, of Ratodero Taluka in the Sindh province of Pakistan. It is located at 27°45'0N 68°19'60E and lies to the south-east of Ratodero

References

Union councils of Sindh
Villages in Sindh